The 1999 ITT Automotive Detroit Grand Prix was the thirteenth round of the 1999 CART FedEx Champ Car World Series season, held on August 8, 1999, on The Raceway on Belle Isle in Detroit, Michigan. The race marks the 17th and final career podium for Greg Moore, who finished third.

Report

Race 
Championship leader Juan Pablo Montoya took his fifth pole of the season, and he dominated the early stages of the race, rapidly building a 6-second lead. Paul Tracy ran second early on, although it did not last for long as his teammate Dario Franchitti passed him. Franchitti was able to pull away from Tracy but had no answer for Montoya, whose lead was up to 10 seconds before a caution caused by a coming together between Robby Gordon and Jan Magnussen triggered the first round of pit stops, during with the top 3 remained unchanged. Montoya continued to dominate once the green flag was brought out, although a miscommunication meant that he did not enter the pits when another caution period caused by Memo Gidley's car failure. The other drivers were all able to make their second stops and effectively gained a free pitstop on him. Montoya stayed out in an attempt to get as big a lead as possible once the track went green. He built a lead of 15 seconds before he made his pitstop, but rejoined only eighth, as Franchitti was handed the lead. Franchitti, despite more caution periods, went on to win the race ahead of teammate Tracy in another Team Green 1-2, with Greg Moore taking the final spot on the podium. The win handed Franchitti the championship lead as well, as Montoya was taken out of the race by Hélio Castroneves after the latter misjudged a restart attempt.

Classification

Qualifying

Race

Caution flags

Lap Leaders

Point standings after race

References 

Detroit Grand Prix
ITT Automotive Detroit Grand Prix
Detroit Indy Grand Prix
ITT Automotive Detroit Grand Prix
ITT Automotive Detroit Grand Prix